Professor Adelardus Lubango Kilangi was the 9th Attorney General of Tanzania.

Early life and career
Professor Kilangi was born April 6 1969. Prof. Kilangi was a member of the African Union Commission on International Law. He also served as the president of the commission from 2012 to 2014. Prior to the appointment he was also a director at St. Augustine University of Tanzania and served at various capacities at the university. In 2013 Prof. Kilangi released research work, “The Principle of Permanent Sovereignty over Natural Resources: Its Application in Regulating the Mineral Sector in Tanzania.”

Attorney General 
Professor Kilangi succeeded George Masaju  and preceded to Eliezer Feleshi. Prof. Kilangi sworn in by President John Pombe Magufuli on Monday November 9, 2020 at State House in Dodoma

Ambassador 
In December 2021, Kilangi was appointed as the Tanzanian ambassador to Brazil.

References

External links
 

Living people
20th-century Tanzanian lawyers
Attorneys General of Tanzania
Tanzanian MPs 2015–2020
Tanzanian MPs 2020–2025
University of Dar es Salaam alumni
1955 births
Tanzanian Roman Catholics